Newtyle railway station served the village of Newtyle, Angus, Scotland from 1868 to 1955 on the Dundee and Newtyle Railway.

History 
The station opened on 31 August 1868 by the Dundee and Newtyle Railway. It closed to both passengers and goods traffic on 10 January 1955.

References

External links 

Disused railway stations in Angus, Scotland
Former Caledonian Railway stations
Railway stations in Great Britain opened in 1868
Railway stations in Great Britain closed in 1955
1868 establishments in Scotland
1955 disestablishments in Scotland